is a Japanese manga series written and illustrated by Norio Sakurai. It started serialization in Weekly Shōnen Champion in March 2018 and was moved to Champion Cross, before being moved again to Manga Cross. It has been published in eight tankōbon volumes. An anime television series adaptation by Shin-Ei Animation is set to premiere in April 2023.

Premise
Kyotaro Ichikawa is a disgruntled loner student who fantasizes about murdering his popular classmates, often reading a murder encyclopedia and learning about human anatomy, with the class idol, Anna Yamada, being his prime target. However, when he observes that Anna is rather quirky in her own way, and when she becomes increasingly friendly towards Kyotaro, he gradually warms up to her and they start to become closer.

Characters

Media

Manga
The series is written and illustrated by Norio Sakurai. It started serialization in Akita Shoten's Weekly Shōnen Champion magazine on March 8, 2018. On April 10, 2018, the series was transferred to the Champion Cross manga website. On July 10, 2018, Akita Shoten merged Champion Cross with their newly created manga website, Manga Cross. When the websites merged, it was transferred to Manga Cross. As of March 2023, eight volumes have been released.

In December 2020, Seven Seas Entertainment announced they licensed the series for English publication. The series is also licensed by Tong Li Publishing in Taiwan.
Individual chapters of the series are called kartes.

Volume list

Anime
In August 2022, it was announced that the series is receiving an anime television series adaptation. The series is produced by Shin-Ei Animation and directed by Hiroaki Akagi, with scripts written by Jukki Hanada, character designs handled by Masato Katsumata, and music composed by Kensuke Ushio. It is set to premiere on April 2, 2023, on TV Asahi's  block. At Anime NYC 2022, Sentai Filmworks announced that they licensed the series, and will be streaming it on Hidive.

Reception
In 2019, the series ranked fourth in the Next Manga Awards in the web manga category. In 2020, the series ranked first in the same category. The series ranked third in the 2020 Kono Manga ga Sugoi! guidebook. It also ranked fourth in the fourth Tsutaya Comic Awards. It ranked thirteenth in Japanese bookstore Honya Club's employee recommendations. It was also nominated for the Manga Taishō in 2020. It ranked fourth in a 2020 poll asking people what manga they most wanted to see adapted into an anime. It ranked first in the same poll in 2021.

See also
 Mitsudomoe, another manga series by the same author

References

External links
The Dangers in My Heart official manga website at Manga Cross 
The Dangers in My Heart official anime website 

2023 anime television series debuts
Akita Shoten manga
Anime series based on manga
Avex Group
Japanese webcomics
NUManimation
Romantic comedy anime and manga
Sentai Filmworks
Seven Seas Entertainment titles
Shin-Ei Animation
Shōnen manga
Slice of life anime and manga
Upcoming anime television series
Webcomics in print